Beni Suef is one of the governorates of Egypt. It is situated in the center of the country.

Overview

This governorate's capital is the city of Beni Suef, located about 120 km south of Cairo on the west bank of the Nile River. The area is well known in Egypt for its cement factories. The nearby Meidum pyramid is the only prominent tourist attraction in the area.

Due to different ways of transcribing the spelling it can also be known as Beni Suef, or Beni Swaif.

The rate of poverty is more than 60% in this governorate but recently some social safety networks have been provided in the form of financial assistance and job opportunities. The funding has been coordinated by the country's Ministry of Finance and with assistance from international organizations.

Municipal divisions
The governorate is divided into the following municipal divisions for administrative purposes with a total estimated population as of July 2017 of 3,171,186. In some cases a markaz and a kism share a name.

Population
According to population estimates from 2015 the majority of residents in the governorate live in rural areas, with an urbanization rate of only 23.2%. Out of an estimated 2,856,812 people residing in the governorate, 2,193,871 people live in rural areas as opposed to only 662,941 in urban areas.

Industrial zones
According to the Egyptian Governing Authority for Investment and Free Zones (GAFI), in affiliation with the Ministry of Investment, the following industrial zones are located in this governorate:
Kom Abu Radi industrial zone
Baiad Al Arab industrial zone
 Industrial zone 31-1
 Industrial zone 31-2
 Industrial zone 31-3
 Industrial zone 31-4
 Gabal Ghareb - heavy industry
 New Beni Suef industrial zone

References

External links

Beni Suef Museum next to the governorate building
 El Wattan News of Beni Suef Governorate

 
Governorates of Egypt